is one of the 16 wards of the city of Nagoya in Aichi Prefecture, Japan. As of 1 October 2019, the ward had an estimated population of 110,436 and a population density of 10,095 persons per km². The total area was 10.94 km².

Geography
Shōwa Ward is located near the geographic center of Nagoya.

Surrounding municipalities
Mizuho Ward
Atsuta Ward
Naka Ward
Tenpaku Ward
Chikusa Ward

History 
Kawanayama-chō is a historic, formerly separate area. Kawana ware was produced at the Kōjaku-in (香積院) during the Edo period.

Gokiso Village in Aichi District was annexed by Nagoya on August 22, 1921, becoming part of Naka District. Shōwa District was established on October 1, 1937 out of a portion of former Naka District and Minami District. On Feb 11, 1944, a portion of Shōwa District joined with a portion of Atsuta District to form Mizuho District. On April 5, 1955 the district annexed neighboring Tempaku village, which became the separate Tempaku District on February 1, 1977.

Parts of Yagoto are located in the Shōwa ward.

Education
 Chukyo University
 Nagoya University – Medical School
 Nagoya Institute of Technology
 Nanzan University
 St. Mary's College, Nagoya
 Kuwayama Art Museum
 Mandolin Melodies Museum
 Showa Museum of Art
 Tsuruma Central Library

Transportation

Railroads
Nagoya Municipal Subway – Tsurumai Line
  -  -  -  - 
Nagoya Municipal Subway – Sakura-dōri Line

Nagoya Municipal Subway – Meijō Line
-

Highways
Ring Route (Nagoya Expressway) 
Route 3 (Nagoya Expressway)

Local attractions
 Tsuruma Park
 Kōshō-ji
 Nagoya Civic Assembly Hall

Noted people from Shōwa Ward 
Sakuma Morimasa – samurai
Karina Nose – actress, model

References

External links